Qalorngoorneq is a small mountain range  in the eastern part of Kulusuk Island in Sermersooq Municipality, southeastern Greenland. At  its highest point is the highest mountain on the island.

Geography 
Qalorngoorneq is located in the eastern part of Kulusuk Island, to the southeast of the Kulusuk Airport.

Walls 
To the northeast and to the east, Qalorngoorneq walls fall directly into the North Atlantic. The southern wall is the smallest, and the easiest to ascend. Its western wall is the widest, with a prominent pillar in the center falling into a post-glacial cirque filled by the Qalorngoorner Imerarpia lake.

Ridges 
Qalorngoorneq has three ridges.

The southwestern ridge is the easiest route to the summit, petering out with several rounded trabants in its lower reaches to the south and southwest of the lake.

The northwestern ridge falls from the nearly flat summit ridge with a series of trabants, the first and highest a rocky pinnacle, the other progressively lower and rounder, extending into the interior of the island above the central reservoir lake.

See also
List of mountain ranges of Greenland

References

External links

Mountain ranges of Greenland